Antosha Rybkin, is a 1942 Soviet comedy film directed by Konstantin Yudin.

Plot 
The commander decides to hold a concert of the front brigade of artists in order to divert the attention of the enemy, who is about to attack the village. Chef Antosh Rybkin should play the role of a German corporal, get into the enemy's rear and release his native village from him.

Starring 
 Boris Chirkov as Antosha Rybkin (as B. Chirkov)
 Marina Ladynina as Larisa Semyonovna (as M. Ladynina)
 Vladimir Gribkov as Pal Palych Kozlovskiy (as V. Gribkov)
 Lyudmila Shabalina as Katya Vlasova (as L. Shebalina)
 Konstantin Sorokin as Fedya (as K. Sorokin)
 Nikolay Kryuchkov as Commander (as N. Kryuchkov)
 Tatyana Govorkova as Mariya Ivanovna (uncredited)
 Vera Krasovitskaya as Larisa Semyonovna (singing voice) (uncredited)
 Grigory Shpigel as Drunken machine gunner (uncredited)
 Evgeniy Teterin as German Soldier (uncredited)

References

External links 
 

1942 films
1940s Russian-language films
Soviet comedy films
Soviet black-and-white films
1942 comedy films